Albert Gottfried Dietrich (8 November 1795 – 22 May 1856) was a German botanist born in Danzig.

Dietrich was curator at the Botanical Garden in Berlin and was an instructor at the institute of horticulture at Berlin-Schöneberg. From 1833 to 1856, with Christoph Friedrich Otto (1783–1856), he was publisher of Allgemeine Gartenzeitung, a newspaper devoted to gardening.

Publications 
 Terminologie der phanerogamischen Pflanzen…, 1829 - Terminology of phanerogamic plants.
 Flora regni borussici : flora des Königreichs Preussen oder Abbildung und Beschreibung der in Preussen wildwachsenden Pflanzen; published 1833 by Verlag von Ludwig Ochmigke in Berlin, the fungi section (hefts and plates 373–396) are by Johann Friedrich Klotzsch.
 Allgemeine Naturgeschichte und specielle Zoologie für Pharmaceuten und Mediciner, 1842 Digital edition by the University and State Library Düsseldorf

References 
 This article is based on a translation of an equivalent article at the German Wikipedia.

External links 
  List of plants described & co-described by Dietrich.

20th-century German botanists
Scientists from Gdańsk
1795 births
1856 deaths